The optative mood ( or ; Ancient Greek , , "[inflection] for wishing", Latin  "[mode] for wishing") is a grammatical mood of the Ancient Greek verb, named for its use as a way to express wishes. 

The optative mood in Greek is found in four different tenses (present, aorist, perfect and future) and in all three voices (active, middle and passive). It has multiple uses: 
 To express wishes for the future ("may it happen!")
 To talk about a hypothetical future situation ("what would happen if I did this?")
 In purpose clauses ("so that it could happen") or clauses expressing fears ("for fear that it might happen") in a past context. (The subjunctive mood can also be used in this type of clause in a past context.)
 In subordinate clauses referring to repeated events in a past context ("whenever it happened", "whoever did this" etc.)
 To indicate reported speech in a past context ("he said that it had happened", "he asked who they were")
 In epic dialects, contrary-to-fact clauses in the present

Post-Homeric Greek is similar to many languages in its use of a "fake past" for contrary-to-fact clauses, e.g., "if dogs had hands". However, Homer uses the present optative for such statements when they are imagined to be at the present time. Together, the optative and the subjunctive cover most of the areas for which the Latin subjunctive is used, but Greek is unlike Latin in not using the subjunctive for contrary-to-fact suppositions.

Over the centuries, the optative mood became more and more rarely used, and it has disappeared in Modern Greek.

Uses

Wishes
The optative of wish or volitive optative expresses wishes for the future: "may it happen!"
 
 . (aorist optative).
 May you be more fortunate than your father!

A wish is not always expressed in Ancient Greek by an optative mood. If the wish is for the present or past, the imperfect indicative or aorist indicative is used:
 
 . (aorist indicative).
 If only, Pericles, I had been with you then!

In the New Testament, the volitive optative is often used in formal benedictions and prayers, for example:
 
 . (aorist optative).
 May the Lord grant mercy.

It can also be used for wishes, as in this example from Luke's Gospel:
 
 . (aorist optative).
 May it happen to me according to your word.

Potential
The potential optative expresses something that would happen in a hypothetical situation in the future. In the main clause of conditional sentences it is always accompanied by the modal particle , Homeric :
 
 . (present optative).
 I wouldn't be surprised (if that were so). 

After  "if" the optative without  is similarly used to refer to a hypothetical future situation:
 
 . (aorist optative).
 There would be nothing strange about it if I were to die (if such a situation occurred).

In the New Testament, the potential optative with  occurs, but rarely (e.g. Acts 8:31);  with the optative also sometimes occurs (e.g. 1 Peter 3:14).

Potential in the past
The optative is used by some authors in dependent clauses in past time of the type "so that it might", "for fear that it might", "(they begged) that it might", "in case it might be possible" and so on to express what it was planned, feared, requested or hoped might happen at a later time than the main verb.

Purpose clauses

 
 . (aorist optative).
 I (have) gathered you together so that we could discuss what we ought to do.

Some authors, however, such as Herodotus and Thucydides, sometimes use the subjunctive mood in such sentences, even in a past context, for example:
 
  (aorist subjunctive).
 He advised the others to sail away, so that the corn would hold out longer.

In the New Testament, this use of the subjunctive for purpose clauses in past time became the usual one.

After verbs of fearing
When the optative is used after a verb of fearing or caution, the negative particle  "in case" or "lest" is added after the verb of fearing:
 
 . (aorist optative).
 I was afraid in case you might suffer some (harm). 

Again, the subjunctive mood can be used instead of the optative even after a past tense verb (see Subjunctive (Ancient Greek)). The subjunctive is also used in New Testament Greek, replacing the optative in such sentences:
 
 . (aorist subjunctive).
 For they feared the people, in case they might (lit. may) be stoned. 

Although the optative after a verb of fearing usually refers to an event that might happen later than the main verb, sometimes it appears to refer to something that may have already happened:
 
 . (aorist optative).
 I was afraid that you had gone mad.

Smyth explains examples of this type as meaning "I was afraid that it might turn out that you had gone mad", referring to what might prove to be the case later than the time of the main verb. The following example, which uses the perfect optative, is similar:
 
  (perfect optative).
 I was afraid that poisons might have been mixed in the mixing-bowl.

If by chance
A conditional clause of the type "if by chance it happens" (made with  + the subjunctive) becomes "if by chance it might happen" ( + the optative) in past time, as in this example from the New Testament, which looks forward prospectively to a potential situation which might occur in the future relative to the main verb:
 .
  (present optative).
 For he was in a hurry, if it might be possible for him to reach Jerusalem by the day of Pentecost.

Past time general clauses
In classical writers, the optative is frequently used in indefinite clauses in past time of the type introduced by the equivalent of words such as "whenever", "if ever", "wherever", "whatever" and so on, referring to repeated events in the past. In such clauses, when alternatives exist, the longer form of the conjunction (e.g.  "whenever" rather than  "when") is preferred.

 
 . (present optative).
 Whenever he was making a sacrifice, he used to invite him.

 
 . (aorist optative).
 (Each day) after (the prison) was opened, we would go in.

The difference between the present and the aorist optative in the above examples is that when the aorist is used it implies that the first action took place and was completed before the second one began.

The optative mood can similarly be used after  "if" in clauses of the type "if ever it happened":
 
 . (present optative).
 If ever he saw something edible, he would distribute it.

 
  (aorist optative).
 They wouldn't let the late-comers come near the fire, unless they first shared some wheat with them.

The optative is similarly used in general relative clauses in past time, for example:
 
 . (aorist optative).
 He used to do whatever he pleased (lit. what seemed (best) to him).

 .
 . (present optative).
 Wherever they made a camp, they used to immediately chop down trees.

This type of "whenever" or "whoever" clause in past time with the optative does not seem to occur in the New Testament.

Indirect speech
In reported speech, the indicative in a direct quotation is usually replaced by the optative in an indirect quotation when the verb of saying is in a past tense ("said", "asked", etc.). The present optative stands for both the present and the imperfect indicative, and the perfect optative stands for both the perfect and the pluperfect. The future optative stands for the future, and its main use is in this construction.
 .
 . (aorist optative).
 They said that the king had sent them.

 
 . (present optative).
 They asked them who they were.

 
 . (future optative).
 He did not indicate what he was going to do.

In the following example, the perfect optative represents a perfect indicative in direct speech:
 
 . (perfect optative).
 It was said that the Peloponnesians had thrown poisons into the wells.

However, the optative mood is not used after every past tense verb that introduces indirect statements. For example, after some verbs such as  "he said" an infinitive is used for reported speech; after verbs of perceiving, such as  "he noticed", a participle is often used.

In the New Testament the optative mood in indirect speech is found only in Luke and Acts (apart from one example in John 13:24, where the text is disputed), and it seems often to be used in indirect questions where there is an element of potentiality, for example:
 
 . (present optative).
 They asked him ... what might this parable be? (King James Version)

Contrary-to-fact clauses in the present (epic)
Homer uses the optative to express contrary-to-fact suppositions when they are imagined to occur in the present:
 
 . (present optative).
 If any other Achaean had told of this dream, we would have thought it false.
Later dialects shifted to expressing such things using a past tense in the indicative.

Koine and gradual extinction
Later, as Koine Greek emerged following the conquests of Alexander the Great c. 333 BC, the use of the optative began to wane among many Greek writers. 

In the New Testament, the optative still occurs (mainly in Luke, Acts, and Paul), but it is rare. There are about 68 optatives among the 28,121 verbs in the New Testament – about 0.24%. Fifteen of these are the stereotyped phrase   "may it not happen!" (or "God forbid!").  It has been suggested that the frequent use of the optative in benedictions in the New Testament was due to a desire to make the language of such benedictions formal and thus appropriate for religious purposes.

In modern Greek the optative mood has entirely disappeared, leaving only the indicative, subjunctive and imperative moods.

Morphology
Regular -verbs and the verb  "I (will) go" have the endings , while contracted verbs and other verbs have .

The order of the cells in the tables below is: first-person singular ("I"), second-person singular ("you"), third-person singular ("he", "she", or "it"), first-person plural ("we"), second-person plural ("you"), and third-person plural ("they").

A 2nd and 3rd person dual number (e.g.  "you both might be",  "they both might be") exists but is very rare. It is omitted from these tables.

  "I go" is almost always used with a prefix (e.g.  etc.) except in poetry. 

References

Ancient Greek
Greek grammar
Grammatical moods